Sarath Prasanna Gamage (born 27 January 1972) is a Sri Lankan long-distance runner. He competed in the men's marathon at the 2000 Summer Olympics.

References

External links
 

1972 births
Living people
Athletes (track and field) at the 2000 Summer Olympics
Sri Lankan male long-distance runners
Sri Lankan male marathon runners
Olympic athletes of Sri Lanka
Place of birth missing (living people)
20th-century Sri Lankan people
21st-century Sri Lankan people